Lake Maumee was a proglacial lake and an ancestor of present-day Lake Erie. It formed about 17,500 calendar years, or 14,000 Radiocarbon Years Before Present (RCYBP) as the Huron-Erie Lobe of the Laurentide Ice Sheet retreated at the end of the Wisconsin glaciation. As water levels continued to rise the lake evolved into Lake Arkona and then Lake Whittlesey.

Origin
As the ice sheet retreated at the end of the last ice age, it left meltwater in a previously existing low-lying area that was the valley of an eastward-flowing river known as the Erigan River that probably emptied into the Atlantic Ocean following the route of today's Saint Lawrence River. Some geologists think that the Erigan could have been a downstream segment of the preglacial Teays River system.  The glaciers destroyed or disturbed most of the preglacial drainage patterns and enlarged and deepened the Erigan basin.

Lake Maumee is the first of a series of glacial lakes which occupied the Erie basin. It was preceded by a few small, disconnected lakes which lay between the ice margin and the southern divide of Erie basin. The name Lake Maumee was first applied in 1888 by G. R. Dryer of the Indiana Geological Survey in an official report on the geology of Allen County, Indiana.

Height of water
As the Erie Lobe retreated to the northeast, it left large debris deposits called moraines running at right angles to its line of retreat. One of these, called the Fort Wayne Moraine, was left at the site of present-day Fort Wayne, Indiana, where it acted as a dam that held back the waters of the lake. When the water was at its highest point, about 800 feet ASL (244 m ASL, but as low as 210-224 masl in stable Maumee delta zones due to differential isostatic rebound of end moraines), it left beach ridges that later became the routes of trails and highways. During this stage, the waters of the lake, possibly in response to an advance of the ice front at the lake's eastern end, overtopped a "sag" in the Fort Wayne Moraine. This caused a catastrophic drainage of the lake known as the Maumee Torrent that scoured a one- to two-mile-wide outlet running southwest to the Wabash River known as the Wabash-Erie Channel.

Outlets
The lake's initial outlet was at present day Fort Wayne, Indiana, the lowest place on the border of the basin. At its highest point, the lake used this single outlet. Later, after further ice melt a northerly outlet was reached near present-day Imlay City, Michigan, and lake had two outlets for a short time.

This outlet flowed to the west, into a developing Lake Saginaw and thence into the Grand River Channel (proto Maple and Lower Grand rivers).

The highest beach is very irregular. The first or highest beach exposure to wave action that the other beaches do not reflect. The second beach is more regular, and on the whole somewhat stronger than the highest. There is a third beach, which is generally weak and in places difficult to trace. The third beach connects with well-defined deltas which the higher levels do not have. The most notable are at the Raisin and the Huron rivers. The outlet at that time may be across the "Thumb" in a lower passage a few miles north. The readvance of the ice sheet may have closed this outlet with a moraine closely bordering the Imlay outlet.

The lake beaches, because of their sandy or gravelly constitution, form better lines for highways than neighboring clayey tracts. Thus, early roads followed these natural routes along the lakes. The move to building roads on north and south and east and west lines has led to the abandonment of all or part of these ‘beach’ roads.

The lake retreats in stages

Two later stages of Lake Maumee, (called the "Lowest" and the "Middle," in that order) had lower water levels because the retreating ice exposed an outlet lower than the Wabash-Erie Channel. The Lowest Maumee (elevation: about  ASL) drained westward through the Grand River in Michigan and into Glacial Lake Chicago, an ancestor of present-day Lake Michigan. Another advance of the ice blocked that outlet, raising the lake level to about  ASL, the stage known as the Middle Maumee. A new outlet, the Imlay Outlet, formed that connected with an unobstructed segment of the Grand River farther west.   There is enough uncertainty about this sequence that some authorities think that Middle Maumee might have preceded Lowest Maumee.

Fluctuations in water level continued through more stages (Arkona, ; Whittlesey,  ASL; Warren and Wayne,  ASL; and Lundy,  ASL. This see-saw pattern continued until an eastern outlet opened at Niagara, establishing the drainage pattern of modern Lake Erie ( ASL). This involved the reversal of drainage in what is now northeastern Indiana and northwestern Ohio as the Maumee River outlet developed by capturing streams that formerly drained into the Wabash. The Great Black Swamp that once occupied much of the land between Sandusky, Ohio, and New Haven, Indiana, was a remnant of the bed of Glacial Lake Maumee. Geologists call the former lake bottom the Maumee Lacustrine Plain.

Highest beach
To the northeast, along the Ohio and Michigan state line, it is  higher.

On the south side of Lake Maumee the highest beach  from Fort Wayne to Cleveland. The maps show it to be  from Delphos to Findlay.

See also
 Early Lake Erie
 Great Black Swamp
 Lake Arkona
 Lake Warren
 Lake Wayne
 Lake Whittlesey
Champlain Sea
 Lake Ojibway
Lake Algonquin 
 Lake Agassiz
 Lake Chicago
Last glacial maximum
 Midcontinent Rift System
 Niagara Escarpment
Nipissing Great Lakes
List of prehistoric lakes

References

Geology and Geomorphology of Glacial Lake Maumee
Formation of the Great Lakes
Glacial Lakes in Michigan
The Quaternary of Northern Ohio: An Outline
Geological Formation of the Great Lakes
Forsyth, Jane L., The Beach Ridges of Northern Ohio, Columbus: Ohio Division of Geological Survey Information Circular 25, 1959, pp. 1–4 (of ten pages) (out of print).

External links
Maumee Valley Heritage Corridor

Former lakes of the United States
Geology of Indiana
Geology of Ohio
Geology of Michigan
Geology of New York (state)
Geology of Pennsylvania
Geological history of the Great Lakes
Proglacial lakes
Lake Erie
Glacial lakes of the United States
Glacial lakes of Canada